Message From Nam is a romantic novel, written by American Danielle Steel and published by Dell Publishing in October 1990. It is Steel's 26th novel.

Plot
The novel follows Paxton Andrews, who is stationed in Vietnam as a journalist during the Vietnam War, focusing on the men she encounters and how her life and the lives of the people she encounters are changed forever.

Andrews has been heartbroken many times, having lost her father, two lovers, and a nanny to whom she was close. These tragedies have left her hopeless and despairing, but by going to Saigon for a third time she finds a love that will not fade away.

Reception
The book was described by Publishers Weekly to be an "audacious and ill-conceived departure from her usual glitzy settings".

Film adaptation
The novel was adapted into a television film, directed by Paul Wendkos, that was broadcast on NBC on October 17, 1993.

References

1990 American novels
American romance novels
Novels by Danielle Steel
American novels adapted into films
Novels about journalists
Novels set in Vietnam
Novels set during the Vietnam War
American novels adapted into television shows
Delacorte Press books